In My Rosary was a German darkwave/neofolk music project with two members, Ralf Jesek and Dirk Lakomy. Though apparently a temporary project, the band has released over a dozen albums since its formation in 1993. Their sound is reminiscent of both acoustic folk music and early gothic rock/new wave, and incorporates electronic elements in varying degrees.

In 2011, Ralf Jesek and Dirk Lakomy went their separate ways. Ralf now continues the style of In My Rosary in the new project I-M-R, with the same live members as before. Dirk makes a more electro style of music with friend Tobias Birkenbeil under the name Lakobeil.

Discography

Full-Length Albums
 1993 Those Silent Years (CD)
 1994 Under the Mask of Stone (CD)
 1995 Strange EP (CD)
 1996 Farewell to Nothing (CD)
 1997 Against the Grain (CD)
 1999 A Collection of Fading Moments (CD)
 2002 The Shades of Cats (CD)
 2004 Greetings From the Past (CD)
 2004 Your World is a Flower (CD)
 2007 15 (CD)
 2010 Retro (CD)

References

External links
Official In My Rosary website
In My Rosary at Discogs.com

German dark wave musical groups
German musical duos
Musical groups established in 1993
1993 establishments in Germany